The Champaign Park District is the municipality association responsible for maintenance of public parks in the city of Champaign, Illinois. As of the fiscal year 2011-2012, the park district had an operating budget of almost $11.5 million. Furthermore, the park district employees about 65 full-time staff and over 400 part-time and seasonal workers.

Notable Parks

Centennial Park

Dodds Park

West Side Park

The  West Side Park is located in downtown Champaign, blocks away from the busy streets and within full view of City Hall.  Originally zoned for the city square and future county courthouse (which was later sited in Urbana), it became in 1859 the first park in the system.  Known as the commons when it was first created, it was in 1861 designated as a public cow pasture where any citizen might graze their cow for a fee of $0.35 per month.

Benjamin F. Johnson (1818–1894), an executive of the Illinois Central Railroad, donated $10,000 to the city for the building of a statue and bandstand in the commons.  Sadly this was not completed until five years after his death.  The statue "A Prayer for Rain" was sculpted by Edward Kemeys (1843–1907) and placed atop Johnson fountain.  Both were dedicated to the project's benefactor in 1899.

Other notable monuments in what is now known as West Side park include the Lincoln Monolith, and several statues and plaques commemorating the Indian War.

Minor parks 
Hessel Park,  of land obtained by the city in 1918, contains a free children's water park run by the city as well as a perimeter path totaling .
Eisner Park, sandwiched between Church and University on the city's west side, boasts 2 age-appropriate playgrounds, ball courts, and a baseball diamond. A rec center building also sits on this property.

References

Champaign, Illinois
Park districts in Illinois
Protected areas of Champaign County, Illinois
Tourist attractions in Champaign County, Illinois